In enzymology, a taxadien-5alpha-ol O-acetyltransferase is an enzyme that catalyzes the chemical reaction

acetyl-CoA + taxa-4(20),11-dien-5alpha-ol  CoA + taxa-4(20),11-dien-5alpha-yl acetate

Thus, the two substrates of this enzyme are acetyl-CoA and taxa-4(20),11-dien-5alpha-ol, whereas its two products are CoA and taxa-4(20),11-dien-5alpha-yl acetate.

This enzyme participates in diterpenoid biosynthesis.

Nomenclature 

This enzyme belongs to the family of transferases, specifically those acyltransferases transferring groups other than aminoacyl groups.  The systematic name of this enzyme class is acetyl-CoA:taxa-4(20),11-dien-5alpha-ol O-acetyltransferase. Other names in common use include acetyl coenzyme A:taxa-4(20),11(12)-dien-5alpha-ol O-acetyl, and transferase.

References

Further reading 

 

EC 2.3.1
Enzymes of unknown structure